Olivier Manchion (born 1971) is a French musician.

Manchion was born in Suresnes, near Paris.  In 1987 he started to perform on bass guitar together with Amaury Cambuzat. They founded Ulan Bator in 1993. They start to release albums in 1995 on Les Disques Du Soleil Et De L'Acier label. From 1995 to 1998 their studio recording is based in a disused chalkmine in Bougival ("Cradle of Impressionism"), near Paris. In 1996 meets Jean-Hervé Péron and starts immediately a long friendship and collaboration with Faust. The first musical meeting being entitled (and released later) as "Collectif Met(z)". Thenafter, in 1997, a French/Swiss tour as "Faust including Ulan Bator". From 1995 to 1998, Olivier also performs several times with Sleaze Art, a 30 guitars collective by Kasper T. Toeplitz (Ircam). Among others, "Zora Mudd" performances at la Fondation Cartier (1995, Paris-fr), Macba (1996, and Barcelona-sp), Musique Action festival (1998, Nancy-fr). During the summer 1998, contributes to some sessions for "Only Chaos Is Real" by Richard Pinhas's Heldon, together with Maurice Dantec, Norman Spinrad, Antoine and Bernard Paganotti (Magma). Also started the ORA project together with Cambuzat and Ron Anderson (The Molecules). In 2000 is released one of the most popular Ulan Bator album, "Ego:Echo" (produced by Michael Gira), followed in 2002 by "OK:KO", a collection of "Ego:Echo" demo sessions and live recordings.

In 2001 (September), Olivier left Ulan Bator and founded Permanent Fatal Error. He recorded "Law Speed", first PFE album, in 2003 (released in 2004). In 2003 and 2004 performed with Damo Suzuki's Network (Can) in France and Italy. Released "Hollyaris" from a Paris performance. In 2005 he's invited by Werner "Zappi" Diermaier and Jean-Hervé Péron to join again Faust, together with Amaury Cambuzat. They toured together in the Uk ("... In Autumn" release by Dirter) and France in 2005/06. From summer 2005 to spring 2007, he's back into Ulan Bator, and tours Italy, France and Sloveny. In the same period also performing as Cargo Culte in duo with Cambuzat (improvised music). Among his other projects : Bias! (with Xabier Iriondo), French Doctors (a collective of French improvisers). Also, he's been artistic producer for Osaka Bondage (Fr, 1999), Viclarsen (it, 2005) and Lule Kaine (it, 2006), and some of his 'Pfe' recordings were used as arrangements on "Home is where the studio is" by That Summer (fr, 2002).

In late 2007 he started a collaboration with the Italian painter Simone Pellegrini.

Since 2001 he has been living in Reggio Emilia. In 2012 he founded the supergroup Arzân with local independent musicians from Reggio. In fact Arzân means from Reggio in the local dialect.

Main discography
Permanent Fatal Error
 Deaf Sun/Deaf Blues 2015 album, cd (Secret furry hole)
 Law Speed 2004 album, cd (Wallace, Ruminance, Klangbad)

French Doctors
 Au chevet des blessés 2012 album, LP (Ronda)

Ulan Bator
 Ulaanbaatar 2007 album unreleased material 1993-98, cd (Jestrai, Ruminance)
 OK:KO 2002 album live/demo, cd (Ursula minor)
 Echo#5 2000, 45rpm (Ruminance)
 Ego:Echo 2000 album, cd (Sonica, Young God Records, Dsa)
 D-Construction remixes, 1999, cd (Les Disques du Soleil et de l'Acier)
 Polaire 1997 compilation, cd (Sonica)
 Vegetale 1997 album, cd (Les Disques du Soleil et de l'Acier)
 Ursula Minor 1996, 45rpm (Popov island records)
 2 Degrees 1996 ep, cd (Les Disques du Soleil et de l'Acier)
 Ulan Bator s/t 1995 album, cd (Les Disques du Soleil et de l'Acier)

Faust
 Trial and Error 2007, DVD (Fuenfundvierzig)
 ... In Autumn 2007, live, 3 cds box + 1 DVD (Dirter)
 Collectif Met(z) 2005, live/studio 3 cds box (Art-errorist)
 Connections 2005 DVD (mop-visioni)
 Impressions 2005 DVD (mop-visioni)

Damo Suzuki's Network
 Hollyaris 2005 live, 2 cds (fuenfundvierzig)

BIAS! duo, w/ Xabier Iriondo
 s/t 2005, ep, cd3'' (Wallace)

Heldon w/ Richard Pinhas, Maurice dantec, Norman Spinrad...
 Only Chaos is Real 2001, 2 cds (Wagram)

References

External links
 Olivier Manchion's personal page
 

1971 births
Living people
French rock musicians
French bass guitarists
Male bass guitarists
Psychedelic folk musicians
Faust (band) members
People from Reggio Emilia
People from Suresnes
Post-rock musicians
21st-century bass guitarists
French male guitarists